Google Stackdriver is a freemium, credit card required, cloud computing systems management service offered by Google. It provides performance and diagnostics data (in the form of monitoring, logging, tracing, error reporting, and alerting) to public cloud users. Stackdriver is a multi-cloud solution, providing support for both Google Cloud and AWS cloud environments.

History 

Stackdriver the company was created in 2012 by founders Dan Belcher and Izzy Azeri. The company's goal was to provide consistent monitoring across cloud computing's multiple service layers, using a single SaaS solution.

Stackdriver secured US$5 million funding from Bain Capital Ventures in July 2012. A beta version of the product became publicly available on April 30, 2013.

In May 2014, the Stackdriver company was acquired by Google. An expanded version of the product (adding support for logs analysis, hybrid cloud support, and deep integration with Google Cloud) was rebranded as Google Stackdriver and was launched to general availability in October, 2016.

As of October 2020, the name Stackdriver has been deprecated to Google Cloud Operations.

Features 
Stackdriver's focus is improving the performance and availability of large, complex applications running in the public cloud. It provides metrics detailing every layer of the 'stack' in the form of charts and graphs. It supports multi-cloud environments, and provides a single information panel into users' cloud services. It provides views into the logs that are generated, and allows users to generate metrics from those logs. It allows users to receive alerts when metrics breach normal levels.

References

Cloud computing
Google acquisitions
Amazon Web Services
Google services
System monitors